Albert C. "AC" Miller (born September 30, 1898-October 22, 1979) was an American attorney and the 21st Attorney General of South Dakota between 1961 and 1963 and the Lieutenant Governor of South Dakota from 1941 and 1945.

Career
AC Miller lived in Kennebec in Lyman County. After a law degree from the University of South Dakota School of Law and admission as a lawyer, he began to work there in his profession. At the same time he proposed as a member of the Republican Party for his political career. Between 1933 and 1940 he sat as a deputy in the House of Representatives of South Dakota , and its chamber's speaker in 1937.

Lieutenant Governor
In 1940, Miller was elected on the side of Harlan J. Bushfield's Lt. Governor of South Dakota. This office he held after reelection between 1941 and 1945. He was Deputy Governor and Chairman of the State Senate. Since 1943 he served under the new governor Merrell Q. Sharpe . In 1944, he ran unsuccessfully in his party's primaries for a seat in the US Senate.

1960 Attorney General Election
From 1961 to 1963 he held the office of Attorney General of his state.
On August 1, 1960, Miller was nominated at the Republican Convention in Pierre, after 1958 Republican Attorney General nominee George Wuest of Mitchell decided not to run.  

Miller defeated incumbent Democrat Attorney General Parnell Donahue with 160,299 votes while Donahue received 138,320 votes.

He died on October 22, 1979.

References

1898 births
1979 deaths
20th-century American lawyers
20th-century American politicians
Lieutenant Governors of South Dakota
People from Lyman County, South Dakota
South Dakota Attorneys General
South Dakota Republicans
Speakers of the South Dakota House of Representatives
University of South Dakota School of Law alumni